Edmund Burke (Stubby) Magner (February 10, 1888 – September 6, 1956) was a Major League Baseball shortstop and second baseman.

Career
Born in Kalamazoo, Michigan, Magner captained Cornell to an undefeated season in 1911, winning an intercollegiate ice hockey championship. In 13 career games, he had 7 hits in 33 at-bats. He batted and threw right-handed. 

After his brief professional career, Magner became a coach, first returning to his alma mater and the hockey team after the resignation of Talbot Hunter. Magner's tenure was short, lasting only a season, but he managed to produce another perfect campaign, this time going winless in 7 contests. Cornell surrendered 51 goals in 7 games while scoring only 8. In 1915, he coached the University at  Buffalo baseball team.

He was a member of the Quill and Dagger society while in college and served as a lieutenant in the U.S. Naval Reserve during World War I. Magner died in Chillicothe, Ohio and is buried at Dayton National Cemetery in Dayton, Ohio.

College Head coaching record

References

External links

1888 births
1956 deaths
Cornell Big Red baseball players
New York Highlanders players
Major League Baseball shortstops
Baseball players from Michigan
Wilkes-Barre Barons (baseball) players
American military personnel of World War I
Cornell Big Red men's ice hockey players